Jessica Bennett may refer to:
 Asia Carrera or Jessica Bennett (born 1973), American former pornographic actress
 Jessica Bennett (Passions), a character on Passions
 Jessica Bennett, guitarist for Lash
 Jessica Bennett (journalist)